Kim Min-kyun  (born 30 November 1988) is a South Korean association footballer who plays as midfielder for Daejeon Korail FC.

Club career

Daegu FC
Kim Min-kyun was drafted from Myongji University to Daegu FC in 2009. He made his Daegu FC first-team debut on 8 March 2009 in a match against Seongnam Ilhwa Chunma, and rapidly established himself as one of the first choice midfielders in the squad. Kim scored his first goal against Gangwon FC on 16 May 2009. During the 2010 season, Kim was used mainly as a substitute player, making eight out of his ten appearances in the K League from the bench. Kim left Daegu FC after reaching an agreement with the club for a mutual termination of his contract in March 2011.

Fagiano Okayama
On 20 April 2011 he joined Fagiano Okayama. During his time at Fagiano Okayama, Kim became an ever-present member of the starting eleven as an attacking midfielder. Kim played in 73 out of 79 league games during his time at Fagiano Okayama and featured in the starting eleven on 66 of those games. Kim scored his first league goal for Fagiano Okayama in a 2–1 loss against Consadole Sapporo on 29 May 2011.

Jagiellonia Białystok
On 28 January 2013 he joined Jagiellonia Białystok on a -year contract. Kim failed to secure himself as a first team regular during his time in Poland, featuring in five league games without playing the full 90 minutes in any of those games. Additionally, Kim also played four games in the Młoda Ekstraklasa, the under-21 league for youth players in the Ekstraklasa. On 15 July 2013 Kim left Jagiellonia Białystok after reaching an agreement with the club for a mutual termination of his contract.

Fagiano Okayama
On 31 July 2013, Kim returned to Fagiano Okayama. After a few substitute appearances, Kim once again became a starting regular in midfield, where he was present in the starting eleven in all eight league matches from 15 September 2013 to 10 November 2013. He scored his first goal since coming back in a 3–1 loss against Tochigi SC on 25 August 2013.

Ulsan Hyundai
On 10 January 2014 Kim joined Ulsan Hyundai on a three-year contract. He scored his first goal in a 2–2 draw against Suwon Samsung Bluewings on 19 April 2014.

International career
Kim was a squad member of the South Korea U-20 team which participated at the 2006 AFC Youth Championship.

Club statistics

References

External links
 
 
 

1988 births
Living people
South Korean footballers
Association football midfielders
South Korean expatriate footballers
Daegu FC players
Fagiano Okayama players
Jagiellonia Białystok players
Ulsan Hyundai FC players
FC Anyang players
Asan Mugunghwa FC players
Seoul E-Land FC players
Daejeon Korail FC players
J2 League players
Ekstraklasa players
K League 1 players
K League 2 players
K3 League players
Expatriate footballers in Japan
South Korean expatriate sportspeople in Japan
Expatriate footballers in Poland
South Korean expatriate sportspeople in Poland
Myongji University alumni
South Korea under-20 international footballers
People from Gimpo
Sportspeople from Gyeonggi Province